The Spy Who Loved Me is the soundtrack for the tenth James Bond The Spy Who Loved Me. The soundtrack is one of only two Bond soundtracks to be nominated for the Academy Award for Best Original Score. The other score nominated was Skyfall (2012).

Theme song
The theme song "Nobody Does It Better" was composed by Marvin Hamlisch with lyrics by Carole Bayer Sager, and was performed by Carly Simon. It was nominated for Academy Award for Best Original Song but lost to "You Light Up My Life". It is one of six Bond theme songs to be nominated for the award, alongside "Live and Let Die" in 1973, "For Your Eyes Only" in 1981, "Skyfall" in 2012, "Writing's on the Wall" in 2015 and "No Time to Die" in 2020. "Skyfall" went on to win the award in 2013, "Writing's on the Wall" in 2016 and "No Time to Die" in 2021.

It was the first theme song with a title different from the film's, although the phrase "the spy who loved me" is in the lyrics. Hamlisch states in the documentary on the film's DVD that the song's opening bars were influenced by a riff in a Mozart tune. The driving disco rhythm to "Bond '77" is very similar to the Bee Gees' 1976 single "You Should Be Dancing".

The theme song became a hit that is still popular today and has been featured in numerous films including Mr. & Mrs. Smith (2005), Little Black Book (2004), Lost in Translation and Bridget Jones: The Edge of Reason (2004). In 2004, the song was honoured by the American Film Institute as the 67th greatest film song as part of their 100 Years...100 Songs countdown.

It also latterly featured in a UK TV commercial for the England-based Unigate Dairy powdered milk brand 'Five Pints' where, as the commercial tailed out, the relevant session singers could be heard singing "Five Pints...you're the best".

Soundtrack
The film's soundtrack was composed by Marvin Hamlisch, who filled in for usual Bond composer John Barry, as Barry was unavailable for work in the United Kingdom due to tax reasons. The soundtrack, in comparison to other Bond films of the time, is more disco-oriented and included a new disco rendition of the "James Bond Theme", titled "Bond 77" which Hamlisch admitted was somewhat influenced by "You Should Be Dancing" by The Bee Gees

An element of the Barry style remains in the suspenseful film sequence in which Bond and Amasova try to track down Jaws at an antiquated site in Egypt. The accompanying Hamlisch music echoes Barry's "Stalking," from the pre-credit fantasy sequence of From Russia with Love, featuring Bond (Sean Connery) and villain Red Grant (Robert Shaw).

A large percentage of the music in the film was re-recorded for the soundtrack album and, therefore, does not sound exactly like the music in the film, the track "Bond '77" being the most obvious. It is a cue that was recorded several times specifically for different moments of the film (the opening ski chase, the car chase on land, then underwater and the gun battle with the troops on the Liparus). The soundtrack album uses a different 'medley' version, slower in pace, which features aspects of most of the variations of the track used throughout the film, compiled into one piece. This version was also released as a 7" single on United Artists records (the track "Ride to Atlantis" was the B-Side). The main theme by Simon also differs in the film; it has a fade out on the album/single but in the film's opening titles, it has a more abrupt ending, finishing with a long electronic note. The track "Anya" on the album does not feature in the film. There are also many cues used in the film that have yet to appear on any soundtrack release.

Track listing
 "Nobody Does It Better (Main Title)" – Carly Simon – 3:29
 "Bond 77" – 4:19
 "Ride to Atlantis" – 3:28
 "Mojave Club" – 2:13
 "Nobody Does It Better (Instrumental)" – 4:43
 "Anya" – 3:19
 "The Tanker" – 4:24
 "The Pyramids" – 1:37
 "Eastern Lights" – 3:22
 "Conclusion" – 1:37
 "Nobody Does It Better (End Title)" – Carly Simon – 3:25

In addition, Hamlisch incorporates into his score several pieces of classical music. As Stromberg feeds his duplicitous secretary to a shark, the villain plays Bach's "Air on the G String". He then plays the second movement's opening string section, Andante, of Mozart's Piano Concerto No. 21 as Atlantis rises from the sea.

"Nocturne No. 8 in D-Flat, Op. 27 No. 2" by Chopin crops up later, when Bond first meets Stromberg, as reportedly does an excerpt from Saint-Saëns' "The Aquarium" from The Carnival of the Animals.

Finally, Hamlisch cheekily segues his score into an excerpt from that of David Lean's 1962 film Lawrence of Arabia when Bond and Anya Amasova are wandering through the desert; according to a documentary on the DVD, this idea was originally a joke by one of the film editors who played the music over the dailies of the scene. It became a trend, with the subsequent two films in the series similarly referencing 'classic' film music within their scores.
Mojave club, the tanker and Eastern lights were written by Paul Buckmaster, who also contributed with arrangements and orchestrations.

Charts

See also
 Outline of James Bond

References

Soundtrack albums from James Bond films
Soundtrack
1977 soundtrack albums
EMI Records soundtracks
1970s film soundtrack albums